Attorney General James may refer to:

Henry James, 1st Baron James of Hereford (1828–1911), Attorney General for England and Wales
Hugo James (died 1835), Attorney General of Jamaica
Letitia James (born 1958), Attorney General of New York
Walter James (Australian politician) (1863–1943), Attorney General of Western Australia

See also
General James (disambiguation)